3rd World Farmer is a browser based serious game where the player seeks to improve their family's standard of living over several generations. It was originally prototyped as a student project at the IT University of Copenhagen, Denmark, in 2005. It was released on May 9, 2006.

Reception
3rd World Farmer gained some recognition after release with coverage from mainstream media such as ABC News (USA), La Stampa (Italy), 4Gamer.net (Japan) and The Escapist (Australia).

References

External links
 Official website 
 3rd World Farmer on Games for Change

Business simulation games
2006 video games
Browser games
Farming video games
Flash games
Video games developed in Denmark